Jenő Hunyady (April 28, 1838 in Pest – December 26, 1889 in Budapest) was a Hungarian mathematician noted for his work on conic sections and linear algebra, specifically on determinants. He received his Ph.D. in Göttingen (1864). He worked at the University of Technology of Budapest. He was elected a corresponding member (1867), member (1883) of the Hungarian Academy of Sciences. From 1885 he actively participated in the informal meetings of what became later the Mathematical and Physical Society of Hungary.

References
 Hunyady Jenõ, Magyar Életrajzi Lexikon
 Márton Sain: Matematikatörténeti ABC, Typotex, Budapest, 1993

19th-century Hungarian mathematicians
1838 births
1889 deaths
Members of the Hungarian Academy of Sciences
Austro-Hungarian mathematicians